A Salzburg Comedy or Little Border Traffic is a 1943 German comedy film directed by Hans Deppe and starring Willy Fritsch, Hertha Feiler and Heinz Salfner. Erich Kästner wrote the screenplay based on one of his own novels. As he had been blacklisted by the Nazi Party he used the pseudonym Berhold Bürger. The novel was again adapted for the 1957 film Salzburg Stories.

Although it was set in Austria, the film was not made by the Vienna-based Wien-Film which had been set up following the Anschluss of 1938. Instead it was produced by the dominant German studio UFA and shot at the Tempelhof Studios in Berlin. The film's sets were designed by the art director Walter Röhrig. Location shooting took place at Bad Reichenhall and Salzburg towards the end of 1942. It was premiered in Frankfurt, while the first Berlin screening took place at the Marmorhaus.

Cast
 Willy Fritsch as Georg Rentmeister
 Hertha Feiler as Konstanze
 Heinz Salfner as Leopold
 Hilde Sessak as Jutta
 Charlott Daudert as Doris
 Peter Widmann as Karl Kesselhut, Maler
 Louis Soldan as Franz-Xaver von Raitenau
 Auguste Pünkösdy as Karoline
 Inge Drexel as Mizzi
 Charlotte Schultz as Frau Dirksen
 Hans Leibelt as Herr Dirksen
 Hans Richter as Detlef
 Elise Aulinger as Eine Bedienstete des Grafen
 Julius Brandt as Eine Bedienstete des Grafen
 Rudolf Brix as Fred, Tanzgigolo
 Heinz Burkart as Der Lehrer, ein Tourist, dem der Steinwurf nicht galt
 Angelo Ferrari as Der Kellner im italienischen Weinlokal
 Erich Fiedler as Dr. Bürger, ein Freund Georgs
 Lutz Götz as Dr. Bürger, ein Freund Georgs
 Max Gülstorff as Der Geheimrat
 Karl Hellmer as Der Zollbeamte im Bus
 Leopold Kerscher as Ein Bediensteter des Grafen
 Sonja Kuska as Die Verkäuferin im Salzburger Hutgeschäft
 Maria Loja as Eine Marktstandverkäuferin
 Ernst Martens as Der Hotelier in Bad Reichenhall
 Marianne Probstmeier as Ein Zimmermädchen
 Claire Reigbert as Die Frau des Lehrers
 Else Reval as Tanzpartnerin vom Gigolo Fred
 Ferdinand Robert as Ein Gast im Hotelrestaurant
 Hans Schulz as Der Lohndiener im Hotel
 Franz Weber as Sekretär
 Ewald Wenck as Tetzlaff, Obersekretär der deutschen Devisenstelle
 Carl Wery as Der Tourist mit dem Fernglas

References

Bibliography 
 Hake, Sabine. Popular Cinema of the Third Reich. University of Texas Press, 2001.
 Eric, Rentschler. The Ministry of Illusion: Nazi Cinema and Its Afterlife. Harvard University Press, 1996.

External links 
 

1943 films
Films of Nazi Germany
German romantic comedy films
1943 romantic comedy films
1940s German-language films
Films directed by Hans Deppe
Films based on German novels
Films based on works by Erich Kästner
Films set in the 1930s
Films set in Salzburg
UFA GmbH films
German black-and-white films
Films shot at Tempelhof Studios
Films scored by Ludwig Schmidseder
1940s German films